The following is a list of clubs who have played in the Premier League since its formation in 1992 to the current 2022–23 season.

Over that span, 50 teams have played in the Premier League. 48 are based in England and two (Cardiff, Swansea ) are located in Wales; they play in the English football league system for practical and historical reasons.

Preston North End are the only former top-flight First Division champions who have never played in the Premier League; they are among a group of fifteen clubs, thirteen of which are active, that have played in the old First Division but not in the Premier League. By contrast, Barnsley, Bournemouth, Hull City, Reading, Swindon Town and Wigan Athletic never played in the old First Division before being promoted to the Premier League.

Twelve of the 22 founder members of the Premier League are competing in the 2022–23 season. Six (Arsenal, Chelsea, Everton, Liverpool, Manchester United, and Tottenham Hotspur) have contested every season of the Premier League. The remaining six (Aston Villa, Crystal Palace, Leeds United, Manchester City, Nottingham Forest and Southampton) were also founder members, though each team has been relegated at least once in the past.

Two clubs, Brentford and Brighton & Hove Albion, are not founding members of the Premier League, but have not been relegated since making their debuts in the Premier League via promotion in 2021 and 2017, respectively.

Table 
All statistics here refer to time in the Premier League only, with the exception of 'Most Recent Finish' (which refers to all levels of play) and 'Last Promotion' (which refers to the club's last promotion from the second tier of English football). For the 'Top Scorer' column, those in bold still play in the Premier League for the club shown. Premier League teams playing in the 2022–23 season are indicated in bold, while founding members of the Premier League are shown in italics. A 'spell' refers to a number of consecutive seasons within the league, uninterrupted by relegation. If the longest spell is the current spell, this is shown in bold, and if the highest finish is that of the most recent season, then this is also shown in bold. A highest finish shown in italics was achieved during a club's Premier League seasons.

The 2006–07 season marked the first occasion former Premier League members were in all three divisions of the Football League following the relegation of Swindon Town to League Two. Since then, other former Premier League clubs relegated to League Two have included Bradford City, Portsmouth, Blackpool, Coventry City, Oldham Athletic and Bolton Wanderers. Oldham became the first former Premier League club to be relegated to the National League during the 2022–23 season.

Norwich City have had the most separate spells in the Premier League, with six, which have lasted from one to three seasons in length.

Three clubs – Luton Town, Notts County and West Ham United – were in the top flight in 1991–92, and so took part in the original negotiations in 1991 that led to the formation of the Premier League, resigning their membership of The Football League along with the other 19 clubs in the top flight. However, the clubs were relegated that season and were thereby not founding Premier League members. Luton Town and Notts County have not returned to the top flight since, with both clubs even dropping to the National League in 2009 and 2019, respectively. West Ham, in contrast, won promotion to the Premier League the following season.

Chart

Overview of clubs by season

Location of all clubs who have competed in the Premier League

Clubs who have competed in the top flight First Division, but not the Premier League

Overall number of seasons in First Division and Premier League
The number of seasons that each team has played in the top division between 1888–89 and 2022–23. A total of 65 teams have competed in at least one season of the top division. No team has participated in all 123 seasons; Everton have been absent for the fewest seasons, missing just four for a total of 120 seasons in the top flight. Teams in bold participate in the 2022–23 Premier League. Teams in italic have never competed in the Premier League, only the old First Division.

Notes

References

Clubs
 
Premier League